Ernest Arthur "Moke" Belliss (1 April 1894 – 22 April 1974) was a New Zealand rugby union player. A wing forward and loose forward, Belliss represented  at a provincial level, and was a member of the New Zealand national side, the All Blacks, from 1920 to 1923. He played 17 matches for the All Blacks—six as captain—including three internationals.

References

1894 births
1974 deaths
Rugby union players from Palmerston North
New Zealand rugby union players
New Zealand international rugby union players
Wanganui rugby union players
Rugby union flankers
Rugby union wing-forwards